The Autumn Stakes is the name of several Thoroughbred horse races.

 Autumn Stakes (Great Britain) at Newmarket Racecourse in Suffolk, England
 Autumn Stakes (Canada) at Woodbine Racetrack in Toronto, Canada
 Autumn Stakes (MRC) at Caulfield Racecourse in Melbourne, Australia